The 1920-21 French Rugby Union Championship 1920-21 was won by US Perpignan that beat Toulose in the final.

The Championship, organized before by USFSA (Union des sociétés françaises de sports athlétiques), for the first time was organized by the new  Fédération française de rugby.

The Championship was open at the better club of the French regions.
After a preliminary round, the eliminatory consisted of semifinals and finals.

First round

Second round

Semifinals Pool

Pool A 

Ranking: Toulouse 4, Stadoceste 2, Aviron 0

Pool B 

Ranking: US Perpignan 4, Racing 2, Stade bordelais 0

Final

Other competitions 

In the second division championship, the  Hendaye won the title winning against Lancey (Villard-Bonnot) - Narbonne 6 - 0.

In the third division the title went to White Devils (Perpignan) that beat the Gallia Club (Toulouse) 17 - 0.

In the fourth division championship the US Montréjeau beat the Réveil Basco-béarnais (Sucy en Brie) 8 - 3.

In the championship for "second XV", Perpignan beat Racing Paris 21 - 0, at Perpignan the April 3, 1921.

Sources 
 Compte rendu de la finale de 1921, sur lnr.fr
 Le Figaro, 1921
 La République du Var, 1921

Notes and references 

1920,1921
Championship
France